Bandipotu is a 1963 Indian Telugu-language swashbuckler film directed by B. Vittalacharya. It stars N. T. Rama Rao and Krishna Kumari, with music composed by Ghantasala. Tripuraneni Maharadhi wrote the story and dialogues. The film was produced by Sunderlal Nehataa and Doondy under the Raja Lakshmi Productions banner. Vittalacharya shot the film simultaneously in Kannada as Veera Kesari (1963), with Rajkumar. This film had its climax scene in Eastmancolor.

Plot
Sathyasena (Gummadi), the king of Gandhara, suffering from paralytic legs leaves the rule to his vicious brother-in-law Soorasimha (Rajanala), the army commander. Dharma Nayaka (V. Nagayya) is one of the victims of Surasimha's tyranny. Dharma's brother Veera Nayaka (Mikkilineni) as a masked man rebels against Surasimha by leading a group of men. He robs the royal wealth and distributes it to the poor. While he is looting the wealth of princess Mandaramala (Krishnakumari), Dharma's son Narasimha (N. T. Rama Rao) fights with the masked brigand and is surprised to find it is his uncle. He learns from Veera how Soorasimha has ruined their lives. Meanwhile, Surasimha plots to ascend the throne by marrying Mandaramala. In an act of deceit, he eliminates Dharma Nayaka and Veera Nayaka. Narasimha takes the place of Veera Nayaka as the masked rebel, annihilates Soorasimha, and ascends the throne after marrying Mandaramala.

Cast
N. T. Rama Rao as Narasimham
Krishna Kumari as Mandaramala
Rajanala as Surasimhudu
V. Nagayya as Dharma Nayaka
Gummadi as Satyasena Maharaju
Relangi
Ramana Reddy as Durjaya
Mikkilineni as Veera Nayaka
Vangara
Balakrishna as a member of the Bandipotu clan
Rajababu as a member of the Bandipotu clan
Girija
E. V. Saroja
Leelavathi
Pushpavalli as Annapoorna
Meena Kumari

Soundtrack

Music composed by Ghantasala. The songs "Vagala Ranivineeve" and "Uhalu Gusagusalade" are evergreen blockbusters. Music released by SAREGAMA Audio Company.

Reception
T. M. Ramachandran of Sport and Pastime praised the cast and crew of the film.

References

External links
 

1963 films
Films scored by Ghantasala (musician)
Indian multilingual films
Indian swashbuckler films
Indian historical fantasy films
1960s multilingual films
1960s Telugu-language films
Films directed by B. Vittalacharya
Films partially in color